The Ontario Liberal Party leadership election, 1964, held on September 17–19, 1964 elected 
Andy Thompson as the leader of the Ontario Liberal Party. Thompson replace John Wintermeyer who resigned after losing his seat in the 1963 provincial election. Thompson won after six ballots against a field of seven other candidates.

Background
The leadership convention was held to replace John Wintermeyer who resigned after losing his seat in the 1963 provincial election. Four caucus members entered the race. They were Andy Thompson, Robert Nixon, Eddie Sargent, and Joseph Gould. In addition Victor Copps, the mayor of Hamilton, Ontario, Joe Greene a federal MP and Charles Templeton, a popular Toronto evangelist and preacher also entered the race.

Andy Thompson had recently attained notoriety for speaking out against Attorney General Fred Cass's "police bill" and was seen as a leading candidate. The convention was held at the Royal York Hotel from September 17–19. Thompson emerged as the winner on the sixth ballot. While the leadership race generated some enthusiasm, prospects for the party were not good. The Liberals had held office only three times for a total of 13 years since 1900. The party caucus had not changed much since the last leadership election and they had recently lost a by-election. They also failed to elect populist Charles Templeton to office. Thompson would last only two years as leader before resigning due to stress induced health problems.

Ballot results

References

1964 elections in Canada
1964
1964
Ontario Liberal Party leadership election